The 3rd Globes de Cristal Award ceremony honoured the best French movies, actors, actresses, plays, concerts, novels, singers, TV series, exhibitions and fashion designers of 2006 and took place on 11 February 2008. The ceremony was chaired by Bernard-Henri Lévy.

Winners and nominees 
The winners are denoted in bold.

Cinema 

 Persepolis – Marjane Satrapi & Vincent Paronnaud
 La Vie en rose – Olivier Dahan
 A Secret – Claude Miller
 2 Days in Paris – Julie Delpy
 The Diving Bell and the Butterfly – Julian Schnabel

 Romain Duris – Molière
 Jean-Pierre Marielle – Let's Dance
 Vincent Lindon – Those Who Remain
 Mathieu Amalric – The Diving Bell and the Butterfly
 Louis Garrel – Love Songs

 Cécile de France – A Secret
 Marion Cotillard – La Vie en rose
 Isabelle Carré – Anna M.
 Julie Depardieu – A Secret
 Ludivine Sagnier – Love Songs

Television 

  – 

  – Sandrine Bonnaire

Theater 

  – John Malkovich

 L'Amour / La Danse – Maurice Béjart

 Anne Roumanoff – Anne a 20 ans

Literature 

  – Jean Hatzfeld

 La vie secrète des jeunes – Riad Sattouf

Music 

 Rose – 

 Thomas Dutronc –

Others 

 Gustave Courbet au Grand Palais

 Arik Levy

 Alber Elbaz

Special 

 Ayaan Hirsi Ali

See also 
 33rd César Awards

References

External links 
 Official website
 

Globes de Cristal Awards
Globes de Cristal Awards
Globes de Cristal Awards
Globes de Cristal Awards
Globes de Cristal Awards